The 2016–17 Coppa Italia Lega Pro was the 45th edition of the Coppa Italia Lega Pro, the cup competition for Lega Pro clubs.

Foggia were the defending champions having won their first title on 14 April 2016 against Cittadella, but were eliminated by Matera in the round of 16.

Venezia won the competition by defeating Matera 3–2 on aggregate in the final, winning their first title.

Group stage

Group A

Group B

Group C

Group D

Group E

Group F

Group G

Group H

Group I

Group L

Group M

Knock-out stage

First round

Round of 32

Round of 16

Quarter-finals

Semi-finals

First leg

Second leg

Final 

Venezia won 3–2 on aggregate.

Notes

References

2016-17
Coppa Italia Serie C
Italy